Palleon nasus, commonly known as the elongate leaf chameleon, is a species of chameleon endemic to Madagascar. It was initially described by Boulenger in 1887. The species contains two subspecies, P. n. nasus  and P. n. pauliani. It grows no more than 9 cm.

Distribution and habitat
Palleon nasus nasus is endemic to Ekongo, south-eastern Madagascar, and its geological type locality is Ekongo, southeastern Madagascar. P. n. pauliani is only known from its type locality of Manjarivolo, l’Andringitra, Madagascar. P. n. nasus is found in some strictly protected areas and reserves, meaning it should not be harmed too much.

Taxonomy
Palleon nasus nasus was initially described as Brookesia nasus in 1887 by Boulenger and reclassified as a Palleon species in 2013. In 1972, the subspecies P. n. pauliani was described and recorded by Brygoo, Blanc, and Domergue in 1972. Palleon nasus is commonly known as the elongate leaf chameleon.

References

Reptiles described in 1887
Palleon